The 2004 Cal Poly Mustangs football team represented California Polytechnic State University during the 2004 NCAA Division I-AA football season.

Cal Poly competed as a charter member of the new Great West Football Conference (GWFC). They had previously been a Division I-AA Independent. The Mustangs were led by fourth-year head coach Rich Ellerson and played home games at Mustang Stadium in San Luis Obispo, California. The team finished the season as champion of the GWFC, with a record of nine wins and two losses (9–2, 4–1 GWFC). Overall, the team outscored its opponents 336–183 for the season.

Schedule

Team players in the NFL
The following Cal Poly Mustang players were selected in the 2005 NFL Draft.

Notes

References

Cal Poly
Cal Poly Mustangs football seasons
Great West Conference football champion seasons
Cal Poly Mustangs football